Savannah Express, is a container ship owned by the Norddeutsche Reederei H. Schuldt company out of Hamburg, Germany. She was completed in 2005. The ship is capable of transporting up to 8401 TEUs at any one time, making her at that time one of the largest container ships in the world. The engines are capable of outputting 68,520 kilowatts of power.

Savannah Express is on long term time charter to the Hapag-Lloyd container line, and is on a 42-day liner run between the US and Canadian West Coast and the Far East.

As of 2020, IMO 9294989 is named Northern Julie.

References

External links

Merchant ships of Germany
Container ships
2004 ships